Grant Stewart (born 28 February 1995) is a Scotland international rugby union player who plays for Connacht. He previously played for Glasgow Warriors. His usual position is at the Hooker position.

Rugby Union career

Amateur career

Stewart played rugby for Strathaven RFC before moving onto Dalziel and then Glasgow Hawks.

Professional career

Stewart has played for the Glasgow U20 side.

Stewart was enrolled in the then BT Sport Scottish Rugby Academy as a Stage 3 player. Stage 3 players are aligned to a professional club and given regional support. The academy was later sponsored by Fosroc instead of BT Sport.

Stewart made his debut for Glasgow Warriors in their opening match of the 2017-18 season - against Northampton Saints at Bridgehaugh Park, Stirling on 19 August 2017.

It was announced on 20 December 2018 that Stewart had signed a professional contract with Glasgow Warriors and that he will graduate from the Scottish Rugby Academy on 1 January 2019.

After 48 caps and 9 tries, Stewart left Glasgow Warriors in the summer of 2022.

He was signed by Connacht on 3 August 2022.

International career

Stewart has played for the Scotland U17s, Scotland U18s and Scotland U19s age-grade sides.

On 16 January 2019 Gregor Townsend named three hookers among seven uncapped players, for his Scotland Six Nations squad. Stewart was among those selected.

Stewart earned his first senior Scotland cap against France in the Rugby World Cup warm up matches at Murrayfield Stadium on 24 August 2019.

Outside of rugby

Stewart's family own a haulage firm.

References

External links 
 Youtube highlights

1995 births
Living people
Scottish rugby union players
Rugby union hookers
Glasgow Warriors players
Glasgow Hawks players
Dalziel RFC players
Rugby union players from South Lanarkshire
Scotland international rugby union players
Strathaven RFC players
Scotland Club XV international rugby union players
Connacht Rugby players